Whitestone is an album by jazz guitarist Joe Pass that was released in 1985. It is his second Brazilian-pop influenced album after Tudo Bem! in 1978.

Reception

Writing for Allmusic, music critic Scott Yanow wrote of the album "The material is not as strong as Pass' earlier Brazilian set Tudo Bem... Pass sounds fine, but the overall results are not too substantial or memorable. A lesser effort."

Track listing
 "Light in Your Eyes" (Andy Narell) – 4:21
 "Shuffle City" (Don Grusin) – 3:16
 "Estaté" (Bruno Brighetti, Bruno Martino) – 3:39
 "Daquilo Que Eu Sei" (Ivan Lins, Vitor Martins) – 4:18
 "Whitestone" (Narell) – 4:23
 "Lovin' Eyes" (Billy Tragesser) – 5:06
 "Armanacer" (John Pisano) – 4:12
 "I Can't Help It (If I'm Still in Love With You)" (Stevie Wonder, Susaye Greene) – 4:43
 "Tarde" (Márcio Borges, Milton Nascimento) – 3:00
 "Fleeting Moments" (Narell) – 3:31

Personnel
 Joe Pass – guitar
 John Pisano – guitar
 Don Grusin – keyboards
 Nathan East – bass
 Abraham Laboriel – bass
 Harvey Mason – drums
 Paulinho Da Costa – percussion
 Armando Compean – vocals (on "Lovin' Eyes")

References

1985 albums
Joe Pass albums
Pablo Records albums